Shannon M. Johnson (November 18, 1983 – April 20, 2012) was an American convicted murderer and rapist who was executed for the 2006 murder of 25-year-old Cameron Hamlin in Wilmington, Delaware. Johnson was executed by lethal injection at the James T. Vaughn Correctional Center on April 20, 2012. Capital punishment was declared unconstitutional in Delaware on August 2, 2016, officially making Johnson the last person to be executed by the state of Delaware.

Prior criminal history 
Johnson's criminal record consisted of 57 arrests on 145 misdemeanor charges and 33 felony offenses since 2001. On December 19, 2002, Johnson raped a pregnant woman. He pleaded guilty to fourth degree rape for that crime. This prior violent felony conviction would make Hamlin's murder a capital offense. Johnson was also suspected in the shooting of his stepfather.

Crimes
On September 24, 2006, Johnson went to the home of his ex-girlfriend, Lakeisha Truitt, in Wilmington, Delaware. The relationship between the two had ended due to Johnson abusing Truitt, but the pair had a son together. Johnson had hoped to reconcile with Truitt and had gone round to see her, but instead he came across Truitt and 25-year-old Cameron Hamlin, who was Truitt's new boyfriend and had been staying at Truitt's home. He spotted Hamlin and Truitt sitting in front of her home in a car. Johnson pulled out a gun and began firing into the car, fatally wounding Hamlin. He then fled the scene. Truitt was not injured in the shooting and ran to her grandmother's house where she called the police. Due to concern for her safety, she was advised not to return home until Johnson was caught.

However, on November 10, 2006, she decided to return home and retrieve some clothes for her son. Johnson had evaded detection, but had been stalking Truitt. As Truitt sat in her car, he ran towards her and fired at her with a gun. He managed to hit Truitt, but stopped and fled when his gun jammed. Truitt was injured in the shooting but survived.

Trial
Johnson was captured and arrested by Wilmington Police on November 15, 2006. He was convicted of first degree murder in New Castle County Superior Court on March 27, 2008, and sentenced to death. Prosecutors also accused Johnson of trying to hire an inmate who was going to be released to kill Truitt and prevent her testimony.

After the Delaware Supreme Court upheld his death sentence in 2009, Johnson said he did not want to pursue any further appeals. Johnson waived his appeals, speeding up his own execution. Federal public defenders twice sought to intervene in the case without Johnson's consent. They argued Johnson was mentally incompetent, but a state judge concluded he was not.

Execution
Johnson was executed by lethal injection on April 20, 2012, at the James T. Vaughn Correctional Center. His last meal was chicken lo Mein, carrots, cake, wheat bread and margarine and iced tea.

Following his execution, Delaware's supply of lethal injection drugs expired, meaning they had no means of executing death row inmates. On August 2, 2016, the Delaware Supreme Court ruled that the state's death penalty was unconstitutional. Due to the ruling, Johnson is officially the last person to be executed by the state of Delaware.

See also
 Capital punishment in Delaware
 Capital punishment in the United States
 List of most recent executions by jurisdiction
 List of people executed in Delaware
 List of people executed in the United States in 2012

References

1983 births
2012 deaths
21st-century American criminals
21st-century executions by Delaware
21st-century executions of American people
2006 murders in the United States
American people convicted of rape
American people executed for murder
Executed African-American people
People convicted of murder by Delaware
People executed by Delaware by lethal injection
21st-century African-American people